The 1990–91 IHF Women's Cup Winners' Cup was the sixteenth edition of IHF's competition for European women's handball national cup champions. Contested by 23 teams, it ran from September 29, 1991, to April 20, 1992.

Defending champion Radnički Belgrade again won the competition, beating Debreceni VSC in a rematch of the previous season's semifinals. It was Radnički's third Cup Winners' Cup and the last of their six European trophies. This was the last edition where the Soviet Union was represented as it was dissolved one month after Spartak Kyiv was knocked out in the Round of 16, while Croatia made its debut as an independent country.

Results

References

Women's EHF Cup Winners' Cup
1991 in handball
1992 in handball